Parupeneus is a genus of goatfishes native to the Indian and Pacific oceans.

Species
There are currently 32 recognized species in this genus:

 Parupeneus angulatus Randall & Heemstra, 2009
 Parupeneus barberinoides (Bleeker, 1852) (Bicolor goatfish)
 Parupeneus barberinus (Lacépède, 1801) (Dash-and-dot goatfish)
 Parupeneus biaculeatus (Richardson, 1846) (Pointed goatfish)
 Parupeneus chrysonemus (Jordan & Evermann, 1903) (Yellow-threaded goatfish) 
 Parupeneus chrysopleuron (Temminck & Schlegel, 1843) (Yellow striped goatfish)
 Parupeneus ciliates (Lacepède, 1802) (Whitesaddle goatfish)
 Parupeneus crassilabris (Valenciennes, 1831)
 Parupeneus cyclostomus (Lacepède, 1801)
 Parupeneus diagonalis Randall, 2004
 Parupeneus forsskali (Fourmanoir & Guézé, 1976) (Red Sea goatfish)
 Parupeneus fraserorum Randall & King, 2009
 Parupeneus heptacanthus (Lacepède, 1802) (Cinnabar goatfish)
 Parupeneus indicus (Shaw, 1803) (Indian goatfish)
 Parupeneus insularis Randall & Myers, 2002 (Twosaddle goatfish) 
 Parupeneus jansenii (Bleeker, 1856) (Jansen's goatfish)
 Parupeneus louise Randall, 2004
 Parupeneus macronemus (Lacepède, 1801) (Long-barbel goatfish)
 Parupeneus margaritatus Randall & Guézé, 1984 (Pearly goatfish)
 Parupeneus minys Randall & Heemstra, 2009
 Parupeneus moffitti Randall & Myers, 1993
 Parupeneus multifasciatus (Quoy & Gaimard, 1825) (Manybar goatfish)
 Parupeneus Nansen Randall & Heemstra, 2009
 Parupeneus orientalis (Fowler, 1933) (Rapanui goatfish)
 Parupeneus pleurostigma (Bennett, 1831) (Sidespot goatfish)
 Parupeneus porphyreus (Jenkins, 1903)
 Parupeneus posteli Fourmanoir & Guézé, 1967
 Parupeneus procerigena Kim & Amaoka, 2001
 Parupeneus rubescens (Lacepède, 1801) (Rosy goatfish)
 Parupeneus seychellensis (J.L.B. Smith & Smith, 1963)
 Parupeneus spilurus (Bleeker, 1854) (Blackspot goatfish)
 Parupeneus trifasciatus (Lacepède, 1801) (Doublebar goatfish)

Gallery

References

 
Mullidae